Thunderstruck is a 2012 American sports comedy film directed by John Whitesell and starring professional NBA player Kevin Durant and Taylor Gray as well as Brandon T. Jackson, Doc Shaw and Jim Belushi. The plot follows a boy who magically gets Durant's basketball skills and the duo must figure out how to return them. It was released on August 24, 2012.

Plot
Brian is a 16-year-old living in Oklahoma. Though he has tried out for the school basketball team, the Eagles, he has never made it, relegated to being water boy for the team. While practicing at home, Brian's sister makes a video of him injuring himself. She shows the video around school, and it is eventually seen by Connor, the star player of the basketball team. Brian takes a liking to Isabelle, a new girl at school, but is embarrassed when Connor shows the video of him to the whole school. In order to cheer him up, Brian's dad takes him to a Thunder game against the Detroit Pistons at Chesapeake Energy Arena in Oklahoma City.

At halftime, Brian is chosen to shoot a half-court shot which he misses and hits Rumble, the mascot in the process. Later on, he meets Kevin Durant and expresses his desire to play just like him. When Durant signs the special edition Oklahoma City Thunder basketball that Brian got to shoot the half-court shot with, a surge of energy causes Durant's talent to transfer to Brian when he hands it over. The Thunder lose the game, with Durant shooting 0–13 in the 2nd half.

The next morning, Brian learns that Connor, who was at the game, recorded him missing the half-court shot and posted it online. Later that night he goes out to a carnival and sees Connor fail to hit shots to win a prize for the new girl, Isabelle. Connor challenges Brian to "do better", which Brian is able to do, winning a prize which he then gives to Isabelle. Meanwhile, Durant's performance declines at practices, but insists he's only in a slump.

After making several impressive shots at home, Brian decides to try out for the Eagles again. The coach, impressed by Brian's new skill, has Brian replace Connor as the team captain, and they win several games. Durant's agent learns of Brian and realizes that he is the same kid who missed the half-court shot. He tracks him down and explains that he believes Brian stole Durant's talent. He arranges for Durant and Brian to practice together to try to reverse it, but all attempts fail.

Shortly before the final game, Brian and Isabelle begin fighting about how Brian has changed. Eventually, Brian goes to apologize and, while watching the video of him missing the half-court shot at her house, realizes what has to be done to give Durant his talent back. He rides his bike all the way to Chesapeake Arena and finds Durant. He explains that he hit Rumble before the transfer, and theorized that was what had to happen to reverse it. Brian hits Rumble with exactly the same ball he used to shoot the half-court shot, and then repeats the conversation that he had with Durant at their first meeting. Durant gets his talent back, and the Thunder qualify for the playoffs.

At the final game for the Eagles, Brian is nervous about playing because he no longer has the talent. Though he plays rather poorly, with help from the other team members, including Connor, he still manages to lead his team to a close game and taking the final shot himself, makes the game-winning shot which sends the Eagles to the state playoffs for the first time in 32 years. Brian, who is gradually getting better at basketball, is later seen playing with Durant.

Cast
Kevin Durant as himself
Taylor Gray as Brian Newall
Brandon T. Jackson as Alan, Kevin Durant's agent
Brant Bentley as Chad
Eric Montoya as Brad
Doc Shaw as Mitch
Jim Belushi as Coach Amross
Tristin Mays as Isabelle
Candace Parker as herself
Robert Belushi as Assistant Coach Dan
Spencer Daniels as Connor, the star player of the Eagles
William Ragsdale as Joe Newall
Hana Hayes as Ashley Newell
Andrea Frankle as Math Teacher
Beau Brasseaux as Drillers Basketball Player
Glen Warner as Photographer
Brie Lybrand as Isabel's Friend
George Wilson as Janitor / Spider
Sean Michael Cunningham as High School Announcer
Lorrie Chilcoat as Security Guard
Nicole Barré as Laurie Newell
Marv Albert as himself
Steve Kerr as himself
Reggie Miller as himself
Oklahoma City Thunder players (including Russell Westbrook & James Harden)
Charlotte Hornets players

Production
While shooting the film, Durant said that the hardest part was not the acting, but rather that he had to miss jump shots on purpose for the film, to indicate that he no longer had the ability to play basketball as well as he used to.

Reception

Box office 
Thunderstruck received a limited theatrical release in the United States. During its only weekend of release, the film grossed $587,211 from 250 theaters, finishing 25th for the weekend.

Critical reception 
On Rotten Tomatoes the film holds an approval rating of 27% based on 11 reviews, with an average rating of 4.38/10.

References

External links
 

2012 films
American basketball films
American children's comedy films
American sports comedy films
Films about wish fulfillment
Films directed by John Whitesell
Films set in Oklahoma
Films shot in Louisiana
Films shot in Oklahoma
Oklahoma City Thunder
Warner Bros. films
2010s English-language films
2010s American films